An edge pull is a skill in figure skating that allows the skater to gain speed while skating on one foot by rocking between inside and outside edges. The momentum across the ice derives from a rising and falling knee action on each lobe which creates pressure against the edge, accompanied by a distinctive "tearing" sound. Another common name for this move is power pull.

Edge pulls can be performed either forwards or backwards. In a series of forward edge pulls, the free foot is typically held in front of the skating foot, and slightly raised. In backward edge pulls, the free foot is held behind the skating foot.  

Edge pulls are considered a fairly basic moves in the field skating skill and appear most commonly in competitive skating programs as a means to maintain or gain speed in step sequences performed on one foot. They are also a common part of skaters' warm-up repertoire. The USFSA moves in the field tests include power pulls in several incarnations at the Pre-Juvenile, Junior and Senior tests.

Figure skating elements